Michael John Bullivant (born 1 March 1934) is a former British long-distance runner. He competed in the men's 10,000 metres at the 1964 Summer Olympics.

He also represented England in the 3 miles race at the 1958 British Empire and Commonwealth Games in Cardiff, Wales. Four years later he ran in the 6 miles race at the 1962 British Empire and Commonwealth Games.

References

1934 births
Living people
Athletes (track and field) at the 1964 Summer Olympics
British male long-distance runners
Olympic athletes of Great Britain
Place of birth missing (living people)
Athletes (track and field) at the 1958 British Empire and Commonwealth Games
Commonwealth Games competitors for England